Sarking is an English word with multiple meanings in roof construction: 
 The use of wood panels, or "sarking boards", called sheathing, sheeting or decking in American English, under the roof-covering materials such as the shingles of a roof to provide support. It is a common term in Scotland, Australia, and New Zealand. The shingles or slates are nailed directly to the sarking boards without timber battens, providing a strong, wind-resistant roof.  
 An additional layer within a roof that insulates or reflects heat, such as a layer of felt, reflective foil, or polystyrene.
 Roofing felt or other type of underlayment (Am. English) under the roof covering for extra resistance to leakage.
 The word sarking is further used as part of the term scrim and sarking, a method of interior construction widely used in Australia and New Zealand in the late 19th and early 20th centuries.
 In modern usage of the term in Australia, sarking refers to a laminated aluminium foil layer, or reflective foil laminate (RFL), that is installed on the roof trusses, beneath the battens, supporting a tile or metal deck roof. It acts as additional radiative (radiant barrier) and convective insulation and provides a condensation barrier.

In New Zealand, both corrugated metal and asbestos-cement shingle roofs were fitted directly over wooden sarking boards in the historical "bungalow" style of house construction.

See also
Scrim (material)

References

Building engineering
Structural system
Carpentry